K-convex functions, first introduced by Scarf, are a special weakening of the concept of convex function which is crucial in the proof of the optimality of the  policy in inventory control theory. Gallego and Sethi  have generalized the concept of K-convexity to higher dimensional Euclidean spaces.

Definition 
Two equivalent definitions are as follows:

Definition 1 (The original definition) 
Let K be a non-negative real number. A function  is K-convex if

Definition 2  (Definition with geometric interpretation) 
A function  is K-convex if

for all , where .

This definition admits a simple geometric interpretation related to the concept of visibility. Let . A point  is said to be visible from  if all intermediate points  lie below the line segment joining these two points. Then the geometric characterization of K-convexity can be obtain as:

Proof of Equivalence 
It is sufficient to prove that the above definitions can be transformed to each other. This can be seen by using the transformation

Properties

Property 1 
If  is K-convex, then it is L-convex for any . In particular, if  is convex, then it is also K-convex for any .

Property 2 

Property 3 

Property 4 

Property 5 
 , for all ;
 , for all ;

References

External links

 

Convex analysis
Types of functions